Prunus occidentalis is a plant in the family Rosaceae of the order Rosales.

Common names
Its Spanish common names include almendrón. Its English common name is the western cherry laurel.

Distribution and habitat
The plant can be found in the Caribbean, Central America and northern South America. It is commonly found in Puerto Rico and particularly in the Toro Negro State Forest. It has been introduced to Trinidad and Tobago.

References

occidentalis
Trees of Mexico
Trees of Central America
Trees of the Caribbean
Taxa named by Olof Swartz